Jack Archer may refer to:
 Jack Archer (sprinter) (1921–1997), English athlete
 Jack Archer (actor), British–Irish actor
 Jack Archer, a character in the video game Robotech: Battlecry
 Jack Archer, a character in The Archers

See also
 John Archer (disambiguation)